Husain, a variant spelling of Hussein, is a common Arabic name, especially among Muslims because of the status of Husayn ibn Ali, grandson of Mohammad. 

Notable people with the name include:

Arts and literature
 Adrian A. Husain, Pakistani poet
 M. F. Husain, Indian artist
 Shahrukh Husain, Pakistani author
 Husain Salahuddin, Maldivian writer

Media
 Altaf Husain, Pakistani journalist
 Attia Hosain (1913–1998), British-Indian journalist and author
 Husain Haqqani, Pakistani journalist, political activist and ambassador
 Irfan Husain, Pakistani journalist
 Mishal Husain, British journalist and television presenter
 Zakir Hussain (musician), Indian tabla player

Religion and politics
 Husain (Jalayirids), Jalayirid ruler
 Akhter Husain, Pakistani civil servant
 Zakir Husain (governor) (1897–1971), Pakistani police inspector and government minister
 Zakir Husain (politician), former Indian President
 Husain Burhanuddin, Indian Qari, Islamic leader and scholar
 Husain Mohammad Jafri, Chairman of Islamic Pakistan Study Centre, Aga Khan University

Sports
 Husain Abdullah, American football player for the Minnesota Vikings
 Husain Ali, Bahraini footballer
 Claudio Husaín, Argentine footballer

Other fields
 Amir Husain, Pakistani-American artificial intelligence engineer
 Ishrat Husain, the 13th Governor of State Bank of Pakistan
 Nuzhat Husain, Indian pathologist

Fictional characters
 Prince Husain in The Book of One Thousand and One Nights

See also
 Husayn
 Hussein (disambiguation)

References